Allens Bay is a bay in Beltrami County, Minnesota, in the United States.

Allens Bay was named for James Allen, who explored the area.

References

Bays of Minnesota
Bodies of water of Beltrami County, Minnesota